The 1932 South Dakota State Jackrabbits football team was an American football team that represented South Dakota State University in the North Central Conference (NCC) during the 1932 college football season. In its fifth season under head coach Cy Kasper, the team compiled a 2–5–1 record and was outscored by a total of 96 to 70.

Schedule

References

South Dakota State
South Dakota State Jackrabbits football seasons
South Dakota State Jackrabbits football